Another Life may refer to:

Books 
 Another Life (poem), a 1973 poetry collection by Derek Walcott
 Another Life (novel), a 1975 novella by Yuri Trifonov
 Another Life: A Memoir of Other People, a 1999 memoir by Michael Korda

Film and television
 Another Life (1981 TV series), an American television soap opera that ran from 1981 to 1984
 Another Life (2001 film), a 2001 British film written and directed by Philip Goodhew
 "Another Life" (The Twilight Zone), an episode of the 2002 revival of The Twilight Zone
 Another Life (2013 film), a 2013 French film directed by Emmanuel Mouret
 Another Life (2019 TV series), a science fiction series on Netflix

Music

Albums 
 Another Life (Emphatic album), 2013
 Another Life, album by James Maddock, 2013
 Another Life (Mark Stoermer album), 2011
 Another Life (Amnesia Scanner album), 2018

Songs 
 "Another Life" (Afrojack and David Guetta song), a 2017 song by Afrojack and David Guetta
 "Another Life" (The Collective song), a 2013 song by The Collective
 "Another Life" (Ingrid Michaelson song) from It Doesn't Have to Make Sense, 2016
 "Another Life" (Motionless in White song) from Disguise, 2019
 "Another Life", a 1983 single by Kano

See also
 In Another Life (disambiguation)
 Another Live, a live album by the pop rock band Utopia (1975)